Giana is a female given name and may refer to:

Multimedia
The Great Giana Sisters, 1987 platform game
Giana Sisters DS, 2009 platform game developed by Spellbound Interactive for the Nintendo DS, iPad, iPhone, and Android
Giana Sisters: Twisted Dreams, 2012 platform game developed by Black Forest Games for Microsoft Windows

Name
Feminine: Gianna, Gia, Giovanna, Jane
Masculine: Gianni, Giovanni

People

First name
Giana Roberge (born 1970), American female road cycle racer
Giana Romanova (born 1954), female middle-distance runner who represented the USSR
Gia'na Garel, writer, producer, filmmaker, composer and entertainment consultant based in New York City

Surname
Adalgisa Giana (1888–1970), Italian operatic soprano
Tom Gianas (born 1964), American comedy writer, director and producer

Other uses
A.S. Giana Erminio, an Italian football club based in Gorgonzola, Lombardy